Notodden Station may refer to:
 Notodden Old Station, the terminal station of Tinnoset Line between 1909 and 1919.
 Notodden New Station, the railway station for Notodden between 1919 and 2004, and again from 2015 until 2020.
 Notodden Public Transport Terminal, the terminal station of Bratsberg Line between 2004 and 2015, and again from 2020.